Between 2009 and 2014, gas consumption, production, and imports in China have grown dramatically, with two-digit growth. According to CNPC, the installed capacity of gas-fired power plants in the country is expected to reach around 138 million-154 million kilowatts in 2025, and further grow to  261 million-308 million kilowatts by 2030.

Natural Gas Consumption 
Considering China's immense demand for energy, gas plays a relatively small role in its energy use, with only 5% of total energy in 2012. However, Chinese authorities see natural gas as a lower-polluting and less carbon-intensive alternative to coal, and gas consumption is increasing rapidly. Natural gas is expected to supply 15% of the nation’s energy supply by 2030.

China's increasing energy consumption has led to the search for new reforms in energy production. This is closely linked to the increasing dependency China has on natural gas.

Natural Gas Supply

Production 
China produced 112 billion cubic meters of natural gas in 2013, making it the sixth largest gas producer in the world. Gas production more than doubled over the period 2005–2013.

Natural Gas Imports 
Despite rapidly rising natural gas production, in 2013 China imported 52 billion cubic meters of natural gas, making it the world's fifth largest gas importer. Imports increased more than tenfold in the period 2008–2013. China has worked to diversify its sources for natural gas imports.

In 2013, China was the world’s third-largest importer of LNG, behind Japan and Korea. In that year, 85% of China's LNG supply came from Australia, Indonesia, Malaysia, and Qatar.

To lessen dependence on LNG, China has built pipelines to import natural gas from Myanmar and Central Asia. In 2014, China closed a deal with Russia to import large volumes of gas from eastern Russia via the new Power of Siberia pipeline, starting in 2018.

See also

 Petroleum industry in China
 Shale gas in China

References